The 1950 United States Senate election in Vermont took place on November 7, 1950. Incumbent Republican George Aiken ran successfully for re-election to another term in the United States Senate, defeating Democratic challenger James E. Bigelow.

Republican primary

Results

Democratic primary

Results

General election

Candidates
George Aiken (Republican), incumbent U.S. Senator
James E. Bigelow (Democratic), former State Attorney for Windham County

Results

References

Vermont
1950
1950 Vermont elections